Middle-earth is the  setting of much of the English writer J. R. R. Tolkien's fantasy. The term is equivalent to the Miðgarðr of Norse mythology and Middangeard in Old English works, including Beowulf. Middle-earth is the human-inhabited world, that is, the central continent of the Earth, in Tolkien's imagined mythological past. Tolkien's most widely read works, The Hobbit and The Lord of the Rings, are set entirely in Middle-earth. "Middle-earth" has also become a short-hand term for Tolkien's legendarium, his large body of fantasy writings, and for the entirety of his fictional world.

Middle-earth is the main continent of Earth (Arda) in an imaginary period of the Earth's past, ending with Tolkien's Third Age, about 6,000 years ago. Tolkien's tales of Middle-earth mostly focus on the north-west of the continent. This part of Middle-earth is suggestive of Europe, the north-west of the Old World, with the environs of the Shire reminiscent of England, but, more specifically, the West Midlands, with the town at its centre, Hobbiton, at the same latitude as Oxford.

Tolkien's Middle-earth is peopled not only by Men, but by Elves, Dwarves, Ents, and Hobbits, and by monsters including Dragons, Trolls, and Orcs. Through the imagined history, the peoples other than Men dwindle, leave or fade, until, after the period described in the books, only Men are left on the planet.

Context: Tolkien's legendarium 

Tolkien's stories chronicle the struggle to control the world (called Arda) and the continent of Middle-earth between, on one side, the angelic Valar, the Elves and their allies among Men; and, on the other, the demonic Melkor or Morgoth (a Vala fallen into evil), his followers, and their subjects, mostly Orcs, Dragons and enslaved Men. In later ages, after Morgoth's defeat and expulsion from Arda, his place is taken by his lieutenant Sauron, a Maia.

The Valar withdrew from direct involvement in the affairs of Middle-earth after the defeat of Morgoth, but in later years they sent the wizards or Istari to help in the struggle against Sauron. The most important wizards were Gandalf the Grey and Saruman the White. Gandalf remained true to his mission and proved crucial in the fight against Sauron. Saruman, however, became corrupted and sought to establish himself as a rival to Sauron for absolute power in Middle-earth. Other races involved in the struggle against evil were Dwarves, Ents and most famously Hobbits. The early stages of the conflict are chronicled in The Silmarillion, while the final stages of the struggle to defeat Sauron are told in The Hobbit and in The Lord of the Rings.

Conflict over the possession and control of precious or magical objects is a recurring theme in the stories. The First Age is dominated by the doomed quest of the elf Fëanor and most of his Noldorin clan to recover three precious jewels called the Silmarils that Morgoth stole from them (hence the title The Silmarillion). The Second and Third Age are dominated by the forging of the Rings of Power, and the fate of the One Ring forged by Sauron, which gives its wearer the power to control or influence those wearing the other Rings of Power.

Etymology 

In ancient Germanic mythology, the world of Men is known by several names. The Old English middangeard descends from an earlier Germanic word and so has cognates such as the Old Norse Miðgarðr from Norse mythology, transliterated to modern English as Midgard. The original meaning of the second element, from proto-Germanic gardaz, was "enclosure", cognate with English "yard"; middangeard was assimilated by folk etymology to "middle earth". Middle-earth was at the centre of nine worlds in Norse mythology, and of three worlds (with heaven above, hell below) in the later Christian version.

Use by Tolkien 

Tolkien's first encounter with the term middangeard, as he stated in a letter, was in an Old English fragment he studied in 1913-14:

Éala éarendel engla beorhtast / ofer middangeard monnum sended.
Hail Earendel, brightest of angels / above the middle-earth sent unto men.

This is from the Crist poems by Cynewulf. The name Éarendel was the inspiration for Tolkien's mariner Eärendil, who set sail from the lands of Middle-earth to ask for aid from the angelic powers, the Valar. Tolkien's earliest poem about Eärendil, from 1914, the same year he read the Crist poems, refers to "the mid-world's rim". Tolkien considered middangeard to be "the abiding place of men", the physical world in which Man lives out his life and destiny, as opposed to the unseen worlds above and below it, namely Heaven and Hell. He states that it is "my own mother-earth for place", but in an imaginary past time, not some other planet. He began to use the term "Middle-earth" in the late 1930s, in place of the earlier terms "Great Lands", "Outer Lands", and "Hither Lands". The first published appearance of the word "Middle-earth" in Tolkien's works is in the prologue to The Lord of the Rings: "Hobbits had, in fact, lived quietly in Middle-earth for many long years before other folk even became aware of them".

Extended usage 

The term Middle-earth has come to be applied as a short-hand for the entirety of Tolkien's legendarium, instead of the technically more appropriate, but lesser known terms "Arda" for the physical world and "Eä" for the physical reality of creation as a whole. In careful geographical terms, Middle-earth is a continent on Arda, excluding regions such as Aman and the isle of Númenor. The alternative wider use is reflected in book titles such as The Complete Guide to Middle-earth, The Road to Middle-earth, The Atlas of Middle-earth, and the series The History of Middle-earth.

In other works 

Tolkien's biographer Humphrey Carpenter states that Tolkien's Middle-earth is the known world, "recalling the Norse Midgard and the equivalent words in early English", noting that Tolkien made it clear that this was "our world ... in a purely imaginary ... period of antiquity". Tolkien explained in a letter to his publisher that it "is just a use of Middle English middle-erde (or erthe), altered from Old English Middangeard: the name for the inhabited lands of men 'between the seas'." There are allusions to a similarly- or identically-named world in the work of other writers both before and after him. William Morris's 1870 translation of the Volsung Saga calls the world "Midgard". The poem "The Gray Magician" (1918) by Margaret Widdemer says: "I was living very merrily on Middle Earth / As merry as a maid may be / Till the Gray Magician came down along the road / And flung his cobweb cloak on me..." C. S. Lewis's Space Trilogy calls the home planet "Middle-earth" and specifically references Tolkien's legendarium.

Geography 

Within the overall context of his legendarium, Tolkien's Middle-earth was part of his created world of Arda (which includes the Undying Lands of Aman and Eressëa, removed from the rest of the physical world), which itself was part of the wider creation he called Eä. Aman and Middle-earth are separated from each other by the Great Sea Belegaer, though they make contact in the far north at the Grinding Ice or Helcaraxë. The western continent, Aman, was the home of the Valar, and the Elves called the Eldar.
On the eastern side of Middle-earth was the Eastern Sea. Most of the events in Tolkien's stories take place in the north-west of Middle-earth. In the First Age, further to the north-west was the subcontinent Beleriand; it was engulfed by the ocean at the end of the First Age.

Maps 

Tolkien prepared several maps of Middle-earth. Some were published in his lifetime. The main maps are those published in The Hobbit, The Lord of the Rings, The Silmarillion, and Unfinished Tales, and appear as foldouts or illustrations. Tolkien insisted that maps be included in the book for the benefit of readers, despite the expense involved. The definitive and iconic map of Middle-earth was published in The Lord of the Rings. It was refined with Tolkien's approval by the illustrator Pauline Baynes, using Tolkien's detailed annotations, with vignette images and larger paintings at top and bottom, into a stand-alone poster, "A Map of Middle-earth".

Cosmology 

In Tolkien's conception, Arda was created specifically as "the Habitation" (Imbar or Ambar) for the Children of Ilúvatar (Elves and Men). It is envisaged in a flat Earth cosmology, with the stars, and later also the sun and moon, revolving around it. Tolkien's sketches show a disc-like face for the world which looked up to the stars. However, Tolkien's legendarium addresses the spherical Earth paradigm by depicting a catastrophic transition from a flat to a spherical world, in which Aman became inaccessible to mortal Men.

Correspondence with the geography of Earth 

Tolkien described the region in which the Hobbits lived as "the North-West of the Old World, east of the Sea", and the north-west of the Old World is essentially Europe, especially Britain. However, as he noted in private letters, the geographies do not match, and he did not consciously make them match when he was writing:

In another letter, Tolkien made correspondences in latitude between Europe and Middle-earth:

In another letter he stated:

He did confirm, however, that the Shire, the land of his Hobbit heroes, was based on England, in particular the West Midlands of his childhood. In the Prologue to The Lord of the Rings, Tolkien writes: "Those days, the Third Age of Middle-earth, are now long past, and the shape of all lands has been changed..." The Appendices make several references in both history and etymology of topics "now" (in modern English languages) and "then" (ancient languages);

Both the Appendices and The Silmarillion mention constellations, stars and planets that correspond to those seen in the northern hemisphere of Earth, including the Sun, the Moon, Orion (and his belt), Ursa Major and Mars. A map annotated by Tolkien places Hobbiton on the same latitude as Oxford, and Minas Tirith at the latitude of Ravenna, Italy. He used Belgrade, Cyprus, and Jerusalem as further reference points.

History 

 

The history of Middle-earth, as described in The Silmarillion, began when the Ainur entered Arda, following the creation events in the Ainulindalë and long ages of labour throughout Eä, the fictional universe. Time from that point was measured using Valian Years, though the subsequent history of Arda was divided into three time periods using different years, known as the Years of the Lamps, the Years of the Trees and the Years of the Sun. A separate, overlapping chronology divides the history into 'Ages of the Children of Ilúvatar'. The first such Age began with the Awakening of the Elves during the Years of the Trees (by which time the Ainur had already long inhabited Arda) and continued for the first six centuries of the Years of the Sun. All the subsequent Ages took place during the Years of the Sun. 

Arda is, as critics have noted, "our own green and solid Earth at some quite remote epoch in the past." As such, it has not only an immediate story but a history, and the whole thing is an "imagined prehistory" of the Earth as it is now.

Peoples and their languages

Ainur 

The Ainur were angelic beings created by the one god of Eä, Eru Ilúvatar. The cosmological myth called the Ainulindalë, or "Music of the Ainur", describes how the Ainur sang for Ilúvatar, who then created Eä to give material form to their music. Many of the Ainur entered Eä, and the greatest of these were called the Valar. Melkor, the chief agent of evil in Eä, and later called Morgoth, was initially one of the Valar. 
With the Valar came lesser spirits of the Ainur, called the Maiar. Melian, the wife of the Elven King Thingol in the First Age, was a Maia. There were also evil Maiar, including the Balrogs and the second Dark Lord, Sauron. Sauron devised the Black Speech (Burzum) for his slaves (such as Orcs) to speak. In the Third Age, five of the Maiar were embodied and sent to Middle-earth to help the free peoples to overthrow Sauron. These are the Istari or Wizards, including Gandalf, Saruman, and Radagast.

Elves 

The Elves are known as "the Firstborn" of Ilúvatar: intelligent beings created by Ilúvatar alone, with many different clans. 
Originally Elves all spoke the same Common Eldarin ancestral tongue, but over thousands of years it diverged into different languages. The two main Elven languages were Quenya, spoken by the Light Elves, and Sindarin, spoken by the Dark Elves.
Physically the Elves resemble humans; indeed, they can marry and have children with them, as shown by the few Half-elven in the legendarium.
The Elves are agile and quick footed, being able to walk a tightrope unaided. Their eyesight is keen. Elves are immortal, unless killed in battle. They are re-embodied in Valinor if killed.

Men 

Men were "the Secondborn" of the Children of Ilúvatar: they awoke in Middle-earth much later than the Elves. Men (and Hobbits) were the last humanoid race to appear in Middle-earth: Dwarves, Ents and Orcs also preceded them. The capitalized term "Man" (plural "Men") is used as a gender-neutral racial description, to distinguish humans from the other human-like races of Middle-earth. 
In appearance they are much like Elves, but on average less beautiful. Unlike Elves, Men are mortal, ageing and dying quickly, usually living 40–80 years. However the Númenóreans could live several centuries, and their descendants the Dúnedain also tended to live longer than regular humans. This tendency was weakened both by time and by intermingling with lesser peoples.

Dwarves 

The Dwarves are a race of humanoids shorter than Men, and larger than Hobbits. The Dwarves were created by the Vala Aulë, before the Firstborn awoke due to his impatience for the arrival of the children of Ilúvatar to teach and to cherish. When confronted and shamed for his presumption by Ilúvatar, Eru took pity on Aulë and gave his creation the gift of life but under the condition that they be taken and put to sleep in widely separated locations in Middle Earth and not to awaken until after the Firstborn were upon the Earth. They are mortal like Men, but live much longer, usually several hundred years. A peculiarity of Dwarves is that both males and females are bearded, and thus appear identical to outsiders. The language spoken by Dwarves is called Khuzdul, and was kept largely as a secret language for their own use. Like Hobbits, Dwarves live exclusively in Middle-earth. They generally reside under mountains, where they are specialists in mining and metalwork.

Hobbits 

Tolkien identified Hobbits as an offshoot of the race of Men. Another name for Hobbit is 'Halfling', as they were generally only half the size of Men. In their lifestyle and habits they closely resemble Men, and in particular Englishmen, except for their preference for living in holes underground. By the time of The Hobbit, most of them lived in the Shire, a region of the northwest of Middle-earth, having migrated there from further east.

Other humanoid peoples 

The Ents were treelike shepherds of trees, their name coming from an Old English word for giant. Orcs and Trolls (made of stone) were evil creatures bred by Morgoth. They were not original creations but rather "mockeries" of the Children of Ilúvatar and Ents, since only Ilúvatar has the ability to give conscious life to things. The precise origins of Orcs and Trolls are unclear, as Tolkien considered various possibilities and sometimes changed his mind, leaving several inconsistent accounts. Late in the Third Age, the Uruks or Uruk-hai appeared: a race of Orcs of great size and strength that tolerate sunlight better than ordinary Orcs. Tolkien also mentions "Men-orcs" and "Orc-men"; or "half-orcs" or "goblin-men". They share some characteristics with Orcs (like "slanty eyes") but look more like men. Tolkien, a Catholic, realised he had created a dilemma for himself, as if these beings were sentient and had a sense of right and wrong, then they must have souls and could not have been created wholly evil.

Dragons 

Dragons (or "worms") appear in several varieties, distinguished by whether they have wings and whether they breathe fire (cold-drakes versus fire-drakes). The first of the fire-drakes (Urulóki in Quenya) was Glaurung the Golden, bred by Morgoth in Angband, and called "The Great Worm", "The Worm of Morgoth", and "The Father of Dragons".

Sapient animals 

Middle-earth contains sapient animals including the Eagles, Huan the Great Hound from Valinor and the wolf-like Wargs. In general the origins and nature of these animals are unclear. Giant spiders such as Shelob descended from Ungoliant, of unknown origin. Other sapient species include the Crebain, evil crows who become spies for Saruman, and the Ravens of Erebor, who brought news to the Dwarves. The horse-line of the Mearas of Rohan, especially Gandalf's mount, Shadowfax, also appear to be intelligent and understand human speech. The bear-man Beorn had a number of animal friends about his house.

Adaptations

Films 

The Hobbit and The Lord of the Rings, both set in Middle-earth, have been the subject of various film adaptations. There were many early failed attempts to bring the fictional universe to life in screen, some even rejected by the author himself, who was skeptical of the prospects of an adaptation. While animated and live-action shorts were made of Tolkien's books in 1967 and 1971, the first commercial depiction of The Hobbit onscreen was the Rankin/Bass animated TV special in 1977. In 1978 the first big screen adaptation of the fictional setting was introduced in Ralph Bakshi's animated The Lord of the Rings.

New Line Cinema released the first part of director Peter Jackson's The Lord of the Rings film series in 2001 as part of a trilogy; it was followed by a prequel trilogy in The Hobbit film series with several of the same actors playing their old roles. In 2003, The Lord of the Rings: The Return of the King received 11 Academy Award nominations and won all of them, matching the totals awarded to Ben-Hur and Titanic.

Two well-made fan films of Middle-earth, The Hunt for Gollum and Born of Hope, were uploaded to YouTube on 8 May 2009 and 11 December 2009 respectively.

Games 

Numerous computer and video games have been inspired by J. R. R. Tolkien's works set in Middle-earth. Titles have been produced by studios such as Electronic Arts, Vivendi Games, Melbourne House, and Warner Bros. Interactive Entertainment.
Aside from officially licensed games, many Tolkien-inspired mods, custom maps and total conversions have been made for many games, such as Warcraft III, Minecraft, Rome: Total War, Medieval II: Total War, The Elder Scrolls IV: Oblivion and The Elder Scrolls V: Skyrim.
In addition, there are many text-based MMORPGs (known as MU*s) based on Middle-earth. The oldest of these dates back to 1991, and was known as Middle-earth MUD, run by using LPMUD. After the Middle-earth MUD ended in 1992, it was followed by Elendor and MUME.

See also 

 J.R.R. Tolkien bibliography
 Middle-earth canon
 Outline of Middle-earth

References

Primary 
This list identifies each item's location in Tolkien's writings.

Secondary

Sources

Further reading

 
 
 
 
 

 
Fictional elements introduced in 1937
Middle-earth
Fictional continents
Fictional universes